Hoodmorning (No Typo): Candy Coronas is the twelfth mixtape by West Coast rapper Game released as a free online download on July 29, 2011. The mixtape is hosted by DJ Skee. The mixtape includes all new tracks and was released in promotion to Game's upcoming The R.E.D. Album. Production is handled by Boi-1da, DJ Khalil, Cool & Dre, Trey Songz, Terrace Martin, Jim Jonsin and more. Features on the mixtape include Snoop Dogg, Dr. Dre, Lil Wayne, Gucci Mane, B.o.B, Wiz Khalifa, Birdman, Trey Songz, Yelawolf and more.

Track list

The Game (rapper) albums
2011 mixtape albums
Albums produced by DJ Khalil
Albums produced by Cool & Dre
Albums produced by Jim Jonsin
Albums produced by Mars (record producer)
Albums produced by Terrace Martin
Albums produced by Boi-1da